Doble Copacabana Grand Prix Fides  was a cycling race held annually in Bolivia. It was part of the UCI America Tour in category 2.2.

Winners

 

 
 
 

 
 
 

 

Cycle races in Bolivia
UCI America Tour races
Recurring sporting events established in 1994
Recurring sporting events disestablished in 2007
Defunct sports competitions in Bolivia
Spring (season) events in Bolivia
1994 establishments in Bolivia
2007 disestablishments in Bolivia
Defunct cycling races in Bolivia